Brad Tapp is an Australian professional footballer who plays as a midfielder for Central Coast Mariners. He made his professional debut in an Australia Cup Round of 32 match against  Sydney FC on 31 July 2022. Tapp is also currently the captain of CCM Academy.

References

External links

Living people
Australian soccer players
Association football midfielders
Central Coast Mariners FC players
National Premier Leagues players
A-League Men players
2001 births